The St. Joseph Valley Rail Road is a defunct railroad which operated in southern Michigan during the mid-19th century.

The company was chartered on April 3, 1848, following authorization by an act of the Michigan State Legislature; the bill called for a line from St. Joseph, on the coast of Lake Michigan in Berrien County east through Cassopolis (Cass County) into St. Joseph County.

The company had difficulty moving forward, but the legislature obligingly extended the deadline in 1861 and again in 1863. On November 21, 1864, the St. Joseph Valley leased the  section of the Michigan Southern & Northern Indiana which connected White Pigeon to Constantine, giving the St. Joseph Valley an uninterrupted running length of some  but still well short of Cassopolis, let alone Berrien County. In 1865 a new act by the Michigan State Legislature authorized the Schoolcraft & Three Rivers to purchase the St. Joseph Valley Railroad, but this did not take place until August 14, 1869, at which point the St. Joseph Valley ceased to exist as an independent company. In the meantime the St. Joseph Valley operated over the Schoolcraft & Three Rivers tracks into Kalamazoo, where it connected with numerous other lines.

The St. Joseph's original stretch from Constantine to Three Rivers is today operated by the Norfolk Southern.

Notes

References 

Defunct Michigan railroads
Predecessors of the New York Central Railroad
Railway companies established in 1848
Railway companies disestablished in 1869
American companies established in 1848
American companies disestablished in 1869